The House of Gantimurov is a Russian princely family of evenks.

History 
They have descended from the Manchu chieftain Gantimur or Gantömör (Mongolian Gan:steel, tömör:iron), who came to live in Russia in 1667. The descendants of Gantimur were confirmed as Russian princes by a royal decree in 1686. They established the village of Karymskoye in Dauria. Their heraldic emblem is contained in the 17th part of the Gerbovnik. Wassily Kandinsky's great-grandmother was born Princess Gantimurov.

Notable members 
 Prince Nikolai Gantimurov (1880–1924), a Russian officer, took part in the Siege of Port Arthur. 
 Natalia Gantimurova (born 1991), Russian model, is the Miss Russia 2011 titleholder.

Notes

Literature
  Artemyev A. R. The Gantimurov Princes in Russian service // Suomalais-Ugrilaisen Seuran Aikakauskirja. Vol.84. Helsinki, 1992. P.7-8
  Соломин А. В. Князья Гантимуровы.- М., 2013
  Арсеньев Ю.В. Род князей Гантимуровых: Генеалогическая справка. М., 1904
  Дамдинов Д.Г. О предках Гантимуровых (титулованных князьях и дворянах по московскому списку).- Улан-Удэ, 1996
  Думин С.В. Князья Гантимуровы // Дворянские роды Российской империи.- Т.3.- М., 1996.- С.215-217
  Гантимуров Д.В. Историческая справка относительно рода князей Гантимуровых.- Иркутск, 1900

External links
  Brockhaus and Efron Encyclopedic Dictionary

 
Surnames
Russian noble families
Converts to Eastern Orthodoxy from paganism